Christiaan Mathys Bakkes  (born 3 August 1965, in Vredenburg, South Africa) is a South African writer. He is the son of Cas and Margaret Bakkes and the brother of Marius, Matilde and Casparus.  He is married to Marcia Ann Fargnoli, an environmental lawyer.

He received a National Diploma in Nature Conservation and led an anti-poaching unit as part of his military service. For a time he worked as a game ranger in the Kruger National Park, where during the early 1990s he was required to be involved in elephant culling, a practice to which he developed ethical objections. In 1994 he suffered serious injury inside the park in a crocodile attack. Hereafter he commenced a new career in the Damaraland desert, where he acted as guide and conservation official for Wilderness Safaris. In 2014, he was nominated as number 7 of the top twenty safari guides in Africa by Conde Nast Traveller. He currently works on education and advocacy projects with his wife Marcia on issues related to wildlife crime, environmental damage and social justice.

Titles of published works

1998-  Die Lang Pad van Stoffel Mathysen.      -Novel. Selected as setworks for Afrikaans first language, Grade 10 Gauteng.
2000-  Stoffel in die Wilderness.              -Short Stories.
2002-  Skuilplek.                              – Novel.
2004-  Stoffel by die Afdraai Pad.              -Short Stories. Shortlisted for the M Net Prize for short stories – 2005.
2007-  Stoffel se Veldnotas.                    -Short Stories.
2008-  In Bushveld and Desert.A Ranger's Life.  -Short Stories. Selection translated into English.
2010-  Stoffel in Afrika.                       -Short Stories.
2012-  Bushveld, Desert and Dogs.                -Short Stories. Selection translated into English.
2012-  Stoffel op Safari.                       -Short Stories. 
2014-  Krokodil aan my Skouer.                 -Novel.
2016-  Beste Stories.                           -Short Stories. Previously Published.
2018-  Plunderwoestyn.                          -Novel.

References

External links
Christiaan Bakkes, NB Publishers
Picture of Christiaan Bakkes and his wife Marcia Fargnoli

1965 births
Living people
South African writers
Place of birth missing (living people)